Chuañuma (possibly from Aymara ch'uwaña oozing of water and other liquids / melting of metals and other things, uma water, "oozing water") is a mountain in the Andes of Peru, about  high. It is situated in the Arequipa Region, Castilla Province, Chachas District. Chuañuma lies south-east of the mountain Huañacagua at a valley named Puncuhuaico (possibly from Quechua for "pond valley" or "dam valley"). Its stream flows to Chachas.

See also 
 Asiruta

References

Mountains of Peru
Mountains of Arequipa Region